"Huckleberry Hound Meets Wee Willie" is the first segment of the first episode of The Huckleberry Hound Show on September 29, 1958. It was produced and directed by William Hanna and Joseph Barbera, while the story was crafted by Charles Shows and Dan Gordon.

Plot 
Huckleberry Hound is serving as a police officer and patrolling the streets until he receives a radio call to apprehend a  gorilla named Wee Willie who has gotten loose throughout the city. After coming across his suspect, the playful ape has no intention of being taken in and quickly runs away into a busy construction site where both he and Huckleberry Hound begin to match wits. The cartoon ends with officer Huckleberry eventually trapping Wee Willie inside a barrel until he later escapes again, taking Huckleberry's entire patrol car with him.

See also 
 The Huckleberry Hound Show
 List of The Huckleberry Hound Show episodes
 Huckleberry Hound (character)
 List of works produced by Hanna-Barbera

References

External links 
 The Cartoon Scrapbook – Cartoon Scrapbook: Huckleberry Hound
 The Big Cartoon DataBase – Huckleberry Hound Meets Wee Willie Episode Details

Yogi Bear episodes
Huckleberry Hound episodes
1958 American television episodes